Henry John Off (born June 24, 1874) was an American college football player and coach. He served as the head football coach at Ursinus College in Collegeville, Pennsylvania.

References

1874 births
Year of death missing
19th-century players of American football
Penn Quakers football players
Ursinus Bears football coaches
Sportspeople from Philadelphia
Players of American football from Philadelphia